Nagatsuka (written: 長塚) is a Japanese surname. Notable people with the surname include:

 (born 1974), Japanese tennis player
 (born 1945), Japanese actor
 (1879–1915), Japanese poet and writer
 (born 1978), Japanese cyclist

Japanese-language surnames